The Krieger–Nelson Prize is presented by the Canadian Mathematical Society in recognition of an outstanding woman in mathematics. It was first
awarded in 1995. The award is named after Cecilia Krieger and Evelyn Nelson, both known for their contributions to mathematics in Canada.

Recipients
While the award has largely been awarded to a female mathematician working at a Canadian University, it has also been awarded to Canadian-born or -educated women working outside of the country. For example, Cathleen Morawetz, past president of the American Mathematical Society, and a faculty member at the Courant Institute of Mathematical Sciences (a division of New York University) was awarded the Krieger–Nelson Prize in 1997. (Morawetz was educated at the University of Toronto in Toronto, Canada). According to the call for applications, the award winner should be a "member of the Canadian mathematical community".

The recipient of the Krieger–Nelson Prize delivers a lecture to the Canadian Mathematical Society, typically during its summer meeting.

 1995	Nancy Reid
 1996	Olga Kharlampovich
 1997	Cathleen Synge Morawetz
 1998	Catherine Sulem
 1999	Nicole Tomczak-Jaegermann
 2000	Kanta Gupta
 2001	Lisa Jeffrey
 2002	Cindy Greenwood
 2003	Leah Keshet
 2004	Not Awarded
 2005	Barbara Keyfitz
 2006	Penny Haxell
 2007	Pauline van den Driessche
 2008	Izabella Łaba
 2009	Yael Karshon
 2010	Lia Bronsard
 2011	Rachel Kuske
 2012	Ailana Fraser
 2013  Chantal David
 2014 Gail Wolkowicz
 2015 Jane Ye
 2016 Malabika Pramanik
 2017 Stephanie van Willigenburg
 2018 Megumi Harada
 2019 Julia Gordon
 2020 Sujatha Ramdorai
 2021 Anita Layton
 2022 Matilde Lalín

See also

 List of mathematics awards

References

External links
Krieger–Nelson Prize, Canadian Mathematical Society.

Awards of the Canadian Mathematical Society
Science awards honoring women
Awards established in 1995
Lists of women scientists
Lists of mathematicians by award
Women in mathematics